The Mountaineers is an alpine club in the US state of Washington. Founded in 1906, it is organized as an outdoor recreation, education, and conservation 501(c)(3) nonprofit organisation, and is based in Seattle, Washington. The club hosts a wide range of outdoor activities, primarily alpine mountain climbing and hikes. The club also hosts classes, training courses, and social events. 

The club runs a publishing business, Mountaineers Books, which has several imprints. Publications include Mountaineering: The Freedom of the Hills.

Organization and activities

The Mountaineers has 7 branches in Western Washington, 3 mountain lodges, and 2 program centers, one in Magnuson Park in Seattle, and one in Tacoma. All classes and trips are organized.

History
Originally a Seattle-based part of the Mazamas, a Portland based group founded in 1894, The Mountaineers formed their own branch shortly after the 1906 Mazamas Mount Baker expedition and dubbed themselves "The Mountaineers" with 110 charter members. The club constitution was officially adopted in 1907 by a membership of 151. Among these original members were Henry Landes (University of Washington geology dean and later acting president), Edmond S. Meany (the father of the University of Washington Forestry school), the photographer Asahel Curtis, and Seattle photographer and North Cascades guide Lawrence Denny Lindsley.

The activities initially were local walks with the first trip being a hike through Fort Lawton to the West Point Lighthouse (now part of Discovery Park). The first mountain climbing trip was Mount Si. In 1907, 65 members made a group climb of Mount Olympus and exploration of the Olympic Mountains. The next year a summit of Mount Baker was organized, followed by Mount Rainier in 1909. In 1915, a club outing became the first sizable group to hike around Mount Rainier and established the route that would later become known as the Wonderland Trail.

From 1907 to 1995, new climbs in the Cascades were reported in the Mountaineers Annual. Since 2004, the Northwest Mountaineering Journal (NWMJ), hosted by the Mountaineers, has recorded this information.

21st century
In the first 100 years since the club's founding it expanded to over 10,000 active members and expanded its offerings from a single annual alpine climb to a range of activities.. Classes are offered beyond climbing skills including nature photography. navigation and first aid. A thirty-hour wilderness first aid course called Mountaineering Oriented First Aid (MOFA) was produced by the organization. The organization is home to The Mountaineers Players which perform in the organization's Forest Theatre on the Kitsap Peninsula.

Magnuson Park facilities
In 2008, the Mountaineers moved from Lower Queen Anne to an old naval building in Magnuson Park, now leased from the City of Seattle.

Lodges
The Mountaineers operates three lodges in the mountains of Washington State. They are primarily used as base-camps.
 Meany Lodge is ski area located near Stampede Pass with 3 rope tows and nordic, down hill, and backcountry terrain.
 Baker Lodge is located adjacent to the Mt. Baker Ski Area
 Stevens Lodge is located adjacent to the Stevens Pass Ski Area

Library
The Mountaineers Library was founded in 1915. As of 2011 it contained 6,000 books and subscribes to 40 periodicals. It specializes in studies on climbing, environmental studies, biographies of mountaineers, the history of exploratory mountaineering and natural history.

Mountaineers Books
Mountaineers Books, based in Seattle, Washington, is the publishing division of The Mountaineers. It was informally started in 1955 when a volunteer committee was formed to create a mountaineering training text from the materials that the Club was using for its classes.

Mountaineers Books has produced more than 1,000 titles since its foundation in 1960. It also publishes conservation advocacy titles under the Braided River imprint.

Books published by Mountaineers Books 

 Men Against the Clouds (1980, revised edition)

Notes

References

External links

Magnificent Views and Vistas – Information, photos and history of early climbing in the Pacific Northwest
University of Washington Libraries Digital Collections – The Mountaineers Collection Photographic albums and text documenting the Mountaineers official annual outings undertaken by club members from 1907 to 1951, primarily on the Olympic Peninsula, in Mount Rainier National Park and on Glacier Peak.
University of Washington Libraries Digital Collections – Mountaineers: 1920 Outing to Mt. Olympus) Online museum exhibit includes images of camps, maps, and excerpts from the 1913 essay Melodious Days by Hugh Elmer Brown.

Hiking organizations in the United States
Culture of Seattle
Climbing organizations
501(c)(3) organizations
1906 establishments in Washington (state)
Non-profit organizations based in Seattle
Libraries in Seattle
Mountaineering in the United States
Organizations established in 1906